Daniel Levin may refer to:

 Daniel Levin (attorney) (active 2004-2005), Acting Assistant Attorney General for the Office of Legal Counsel of the U.S. Justice Department
 Daniel Levin (writer) (born ), American attorney and novelist
 Daniel Levin (author) (born ),  Swiss-American writer, attorney, and political commentator

See also
Daniel Levine (disambiguation)
Daniel Lewin (1970–2001), American-Israeli mathematician and entrepreneur